The 1939 Ottawa Rough Riders finished in 1st place in the Interprovincial Rugby Football Union with a 5–1 record, but lost the 27th Grey Cup to the Winnipeg Blue Bombers.

Regular season

Standings

Schedule

Postseason

References

Ottawa Rough Riders seasons
James S. Dixon Trophy championship seasons